The Cape Fear Crocs were a minor league baseball team in Fayetteville, North Carolina.  

They were a low Class-A baseball team which played in the South Atlantic League, and were a farm team of the Montreal Expos for the franchise's entire tenure as the Cape Fear Crocs.  

They played all of their home games at J. P. Riddle Stadium and were previously known as the Fayetteville Generals. 

Even though the Crocs were a perennial playoff team during their time in the SAL, poor attendance figures and problems having their existing stadium renovated and updated to league standards or even a new downtown stadium built, all proved too much to bear for the ownership of the struggling franchise.  

Prior to the 2001 season, the Crocs were sold and moved to New Jersey, where they officially became the Lakewood BlueClaws, and dropped their affiliation with the Expos in favor of becoming an affiliate of the Philadelphia Phillies.

Their mascot was the Cape Fear Croc.

List of Cape Fear Crocs players in the MLB
All players are listed in alphabetical order by their surname, with the year(s) they played for Cape Fear in parentheses.
Matt Blank (1998)
Milton Bradley (1998)
Nate Field (1999)
Bryan Hebson (1998–1999)
Jorge Julio (1998)
Yovanny Lara (1998)
Cliff Lee (2000)
Henry Mateo (1998)
Guillermo Mota (1997)
Talmadge Nunnari (1997–1998)
Christian Parker (1997)
Valentino Pascucci (2000)
Brandon Phillips (2000)
Simon Pond (1997)
Wilkin Ruan (1999–2000)
Brian Schneider (1997–1998)
Jim Serrano (1998)
J.D. Smart (1998)
Scott Strickland (1997–1998)
Andy Tracy (1997)
Wilson Valdéz (2000)
Tim Young (1997)

Year-by-year record

References

Defunct South Atlantic League teams
Montreal Expos minor league affiliates
Sports in Fayetteville, North Carolina
Professional baseball teams in North Carolina
1997 establishments in North Carolina
2000 disestablishments in North Carolina
Baseball teams established in 1997
Baseball teams disestablished in 2000
Defunct baseball teams in North Carolina